LY-456220 is a potent and selective serotonin 5-HT1D receptor antagonist which has been used in research to study the function of presynaptic 5-HT1D autoreceptors. LY-456220 lacks significant affinity for the 5-HT1B, α1 adrenergic, and dopamine D2 receptors.

References 

5-HT1 antagonists
Fluoroarenes
Tetrahydropyridines
Indoles
Chromanes
Carboxamides